Hunter (also called Stoney Creek) is a census-designated place (CDP) and unincorporated community located northeast of Elizabethton in Carter County, Tennessee, United States, along Tennessee State Route 91 and the Watauga River. Its population was 1,854 as of the 2010 census. It is part of the Johnson City Metropolitan Statistical Area, which is a component of the Johnson City–Kingsport–Bristol, TN-VA Combined Statistical Area – commonly known as the "Tri-Cities" region. Hunter is a suburb of Elizabethton.

Geography
Hunter is located at  (36.376630, -82.155032).

The Watauga River forms a southern boundary for the Hunter community, while the Holston Mountain forms a northern boundary.

Demographics

 As of the census of 2000, there were 1,566 people, 689 households, and 491 families residing in the CDP. The population density was 254.9 people per square mile (98.5/km2). There were 729 housing units at an average density of 118.6/sq mi (45.8/km2). The racial makeup of the CDP was 99.17% White, 0.13% African American, 0.06% Native American, 0.13% Asian, 0.06% from other races, and 0.45% from two or more races. Hispanic or Latino of any race were 1.15% of the population.

There were 689 households, out of which 27.7% had children under the age of 18 living with them, 57.9% were married couples living together, 10.7% had a female householder with no husband present, and 28.7% were non-families. 25.5% of all households were made up of individuals, and 10.9% had someone living alone who was 65 years of age or older. The average household size was 2.27 and the average family size was 2.71.

In the CDP, the population was spread out, with 19.3% under the age of 18, 8.0% from 18 to 24, 28.7% from 25 to 44, 27.3% from 45 to 64, and 16.7% who were 65 years of age or older. The median age was 41 years. For every 100 females, there were 90.0 males. For every 100 females age 18 and over, there were 88.5 males.

The median income for a household in the CDP was $30,968, and the median income for a family was $37,981. Males had a median income of $25,000 versus $20,668 for females. The per capita income for the CDP was $15,590. About 5.6% of families and 8.7% of the population were below the poverty line, including 9.7% of those under age 18 and 8.5% of those age 65 or over.

Education
Schools in Hunter/Stoney Creek are operated by Carter County Schools:

Hunter Elementary – Grades PK–8
Unaka Elementary – Grades PK–8
Unaka High - Grades 9–12

The Elizabethton campus of Northeast State Community College is located near Hunter.

Connection with U.S. Interstate Highway System
 Interstate 26  Exit 24 at Johnson City then east on
  Tennessee State Route 67 to Elizabethton, then left on
 Tennessee State Route 67/US 19E then right on
 Tennessee State Route 91 Stoney Creek Exit to Hunter.

References

External links
 Tennessee Technology Center, Elizabethton Tennessee Home Page

Census-designated places in Carter County, Tennessee
Census-designated places in Tennessee
Johnson City metropolitan area, Tennessee